Pandurista is a genus of moths belonging to the subfamily Tortricinae of the family Tortricidae.

Species
Pandurista encarsiotoma Diakonoff, 1953
Pandurista euptycha Diakonoff, 1975
Pandurista regressa Diakonoff, 1976
Pandurista stictocrossa Meyrick, 1918

See also
List of Tortricidae genera

References

External links
tortricidae.com

Tortricidae genera
Epitymbiini